Chris Cobb (born ca. 1964) is a British computer scientist and Pro Vice-Chancellor, Chief Operating Officer at the University of London. He has been  Pro Vice-Chancellor at University of Roehampton, London, England and prior to that was at London School of Economics. In 2020, he was appointed as Chief Executive of the Associated Board of the Royal Schools of Music, despite not having any professional background in music.

Life and work 
Cobb received his degree in Business and Computing in the late 1980s, and started his career at the London School of Economics and Political Science (LSE) as an analyst programmer, and later becoming Director of Business Systems and Services in 1996. In 2005 he was appointed Pro Vice-Chancellor at Roehampton University, and in 2011 back at the University of London, he became Chief Operating Officer and University Secretary. He was promoted to PVC in 2014.

Cobb taught University IT Management on the ESMU – HUMANE Winter School for Senior University Administrators and has undertaken JISC funded research in the use of IT in Chinese Universities as part of the Leadership Foundation for Higher Education Sino-UK exchange programme.

Previously Cobb was a member of the AHUA National Executive (2014–2016) where he led in liaison with Jisc and Universities UK on cybersecurity. Previously he has sat on a number of national working groups relating to IT in Higher Education, including the Jisc Organisation Support Committee, Board membership of JISC infoNet. and chairing the Universities and Colleges Information Systems Association (UCISA) CISG between 2003 and 2005. He also chaired a Universities and Colleges Admissions Service (UCAS) working group investigating improvements to the recruitment and admittance of part-time students into Higher Education.

Cobb is an advocate of sharing services across universities and speaks regularly on the advantages of efficiency, quality and cost. He has been awarded several grants to develop new services and was a member of the Higher Education Funding Council for England (HEFCE) Shared Services working group. He now chairs Co Sector Ltd, the University of London's shared services organisation.

Cobb provides consultancy to other universities on the use of IT and in 2008 (on behalf of the European University Association) provided advice on the integration on IT infrastructure and systems for the merger of four universities in Strasbourg; Louis Pasteur University, Robert Schuman University, Marc Bloch University and l'Institut Universitaire de Formation des Maîtres d'Alsace. In 2008 Cobb led a successful funding bid from the JISC to experiment in the use of enterprise architecture within a university context with the specific aim of developing a service-oriented architecture to systems integration and thus enabling greater accessibility to shared services. This project concluded in mid-2010. In 2013 Cobb is involved in developing the University of London into a "significant provider of shared services to higher education". Cobb participated in the Ian Diamond Efficiency Reviews and regularly speaks on University Efficiency.

He is a judge on the Times Higher Education Awards and the Times Higher Education Leadership and Management Awards and is on the National Executive Committee of the Association of Heads of University Administration. He is elected Fellow of the Royal Society of Arts. He is also a Freeman of the Worshipful Company of Information Technologists and the City of London. He is also a member of Oracle Education and Research Strategy Council www.oracle.com and a Governor of Goodenough College http://www.goodenough.ac.uk and Chair of the Leadership Foundation Integrated Reporting Advisory Group, https://www.lfhe.ac.uk/en/news/index.cfm/IntegratedThinkingannoucement
In addition, he is a member of the HESA Data Futures Group http://www.hefce.ac.uk/funding/finsustain/fssg/ 
and a member of the Emerge Education HE Growth Board http://emerge.education/ and also a member of the HUMANE Roundtable http://www.humane.eu/about/governing-bodies/ 
He also sits on the HE Financial Sustainability Strategy Group http://www.hefce.ac.uk/funding/finsustain/fssg/

Controversy
Cobb came under fire from student activists and left-wing politicians for his handling of a series of protests by students and workers, and in an Early day motion in the House of Commons, George Galloway described Cobb as being "nakedly mendacious" for saying that the University supported peaceful protest.

Quotes
 "HEFCE has defined shared services as a 'model of providing services in a combined or collaborative function, sharing processes and technology'... Previously there appeared to be a built-in opposition to shared services due to infringement of institutional independence and the constraints over operational flexibility – but that's now gone.Among staff there is now probably greater anxiety and suspicion about shared services. Many feel that it is just a euphemism for outsourcing, putting jobs at risk – more so now than previously due to the backdrop of funding reductions and an increase in redundancy programmes.Where the service is going to be shared across a number of institutions, you're going to be part of a larger group so your career opportunities and potential for broadening the impact of what you do and developing your experience and skill base will be enhanced. It can be lonely if you're the only person in an institution working on a particular area."
 Chris Cobb (2011) "Sharing services why dialogue is key to success" in JISC Inform, Issue 32, Autumn 2011. p. 2
 "The best tool of all is a conversation. E-mails and reports aren't enough, it's amazing how little understood shared services are and how entrenched views can be. A simple and on-going dialogue can be time consuming but is time well spent. Above all, keep the dialogue going. The same's true of a lot of things – if you have a conversation, the hostility and opposition falls away."
 Chris Cobb (2011) "Sharing services why dialogue is key to success" in JISC Inform, Issue 32, Autumn 2011. p. 2
 “What is already known is that there will be no winners or losers. Legal fees have been eye watering, diverting valuable resources that could otherwise have been used to fund research and teaching. The irony is that the legal fees dwarf the budget savings that the Warburg were originally asked to find.”
Chris Cobb (2014) “Battle for the Warburg”  Times Higher 25 October 2014

 “ Despite not being public authorities, universities are included in the FoI Act 2000 owing to the level of direct and indirect public funding that they receive. As public funding for universities reduces and the level of competition increases (not least from private providers, who are not subject to FoI), surely it is time to reconsider this? “
“Universities that receive less than 50 per cent of their income from public sources already have discretion on whether to follow European procurement rules. The same logic should apply to FoI. As public funding recedes, it is only fair to give universities the wherewithal to survive in an ever more competitive world.”
Chris Cobb (2014) “Should Universities be exempt from the FOI Act?” in Times Higher 20 November 2014.

 “Despite some very successful Massive Open On-Line Courses (MOOCs), the initial excitement seems to have subsided as universities struggle to fund the altruism.”
 “As with other sectors, universities are also waking up to the high capital costs of proprietary server rooms as well as the opportunities of ‘software as a service’ and cloud-based solutions. Economies of scale, increased resilience and more affordable high-performance computing are being achieved from shared data centres and shared support services.”
“Technology is also driving the design of our physical estate and pedagogic approaches. Ubiquitous high-speed Wi-Fi is now a baseline student expectation on open days. Demand for large lecture theatres is diminishing with the advent of ‘flipped classrooms’, where students watch lectures online so that face-time with lecturers can be more focused. Library book shelves are giving way to ‘BYOD’ (bring your own device) study spaces and librarians are redeploying their expertise from cataloguing to discerning discovery of digital resources.”

 Chris Cobb “Massive Open On-Line Courses and Beyond”  January 2015 for BETT Conference.
 “While China strengthens and the US giant wakes from its slumber, the UK appears to be sleepwalking into a nightmarish scenario”
 Chris Cobb “Wake-up call for UK as giants stir in the global student market” in Times Higher April 30, 2015

Selected publications
 Chris Cobb. "New approaches to technology in HE management." Perspectives: Policy and Practice in Higher Education 16.4 (2012): 136–145.
 Chris Cobb. "Battle for the Warburg"
 Chris Cobb. "Should Universities be exempt from the FOI Act" 
 Chris Cobb "Massive Open On-Line Courses and Beyond" 
 Chris Cobb "Wake-up call for UK as giants stir in the global student market"

References

External links
 Chris Cobb at london.ac.uk
 Leading experts in Higher Education discuss the role of technology youtube.com
 Youtube.com

Year of birth missing (living people)
Living people
British computer scientists
Enterprise modelling experts
Academics of the University of Roehampton
British academic administrators
People associated with the University of London
Academics of the London School of Economics